Lithium peroxide is the inorganic compound with the formula Li2O2. It is a white, nonhygroscopic solid. Because of its high oxygen:mass and oxygen:volume ratios, the solid has been used to remove CO2 from the atmosphere in spacecraft.

Preparation
It is prepared by the reaction of hydrogen peroxide and lithium hydroxide. This reaction initially produces lithium hydroperoxide:
LiOH + H2O2 → LiOOH + H2O
This lithium hydroperoxide has also been described as lithium peroxide monoperoxohydrate trihydrate (Li2O2·H2O2·3H2O).
Dehydration of this material gives the anhydrous peroxide salt:
2 LiOOH → Li2O2 + H2O2 

Li2O2 decomposes at about 450 °C to give lithium oxide:
2 Li2O2 → 2 Li2O + O2

The structure of solid Li2O2 has been determined by X-ray crystallography and density functional theory. The solid features an eclipsed "ethane-like" Li6O2 subunits with an O-O distance of around 1.5 Å.

Uses
It is used in air purifiers where weight is important, e.g., spacecraft to absorb carbon dioxide and release oxygen in the reaction:
Li2O2 + CO2 → Li2CO3 +  O2
It absorbs more CO2 than does the same weight of lithium hydroxide and offers the bonus of releasing oxygen.  Furthermore, unlike most other alkali metal peroxides, it is not hygroscopic.

The reversible lithium peroxide reaction is the basis for a prototype lithium–air battery. Using oxygen from the atmosphere allows the battery to eliminate storage of oxygen for its reaction, saving battery weight and size.

The successful combination of a lithium-air battery overlain with an air-permeable mesh solar cell was announced by The Ohio State University in 2014. The combination of two functions in one device (a "solar battery") is expected to reduce costs significantly compared to separate devices and controllers as are currently employed.

See also
 Lithium oxide

References

External links
 WebElements entry

Peroxides
Lithium compounds
Oxidizing agents